Béatrice Schönberg (née Béatrice Szabo; 9 May 1953) is a French television journalist.

She anchored the newscasts on La Cinq from 1987 to 1992 and on France 2 from 1997 to 2007.

She was formerly married to the musician and composer Claude-Michel Schönberg.

On 21 July 2005 she married the French politician Jean-Louis Borloo at Rueil-Malmaison, Hauts-de-Seine. The journalists' union SDJ (Société des journalistes) then called for her resignation.

In September 2006, France 2 announced they had come to an agreement with Ms. Schönberg.  Effective 25 February 2007, she was replaced as news anchor by Laurent Delahousse, but would continue with the network as the host of a prime-time science program.  She did not return to the network after the second part of the presidential election in May 2007 because her husband was given a cabinet post in President Nicolas Sarkozy's government.

References

External links
official website

1953 births
Living people
French television journalists
French women journalists
French people of Hungarian-Jewish descent
Knights of the Ordre national du Mérite
Journalists from Paris